Raymond Patterson (November 23, 1911 – December 30, 2001) was an American animator, producer, and director. He was born in Hollywood, California, and was the younger brother of animator Don Patterson.

Career 

Patterson's earliest works in animation were for Charles B. Mintz's Krazy Kat/Screen Gems studio, where he started as an inker in 1929. He remained at Mintz for eleven years. In 1940, he moved to the Walt Disney Studio, where he animated on Fantasia and Dumbo, as well as several Pluto shorts (Bone Trouble and Pluto's Playmate). By 1942, he mostly worked on Donald Duck shorts such as Donald Gets Drafted.

Patterson left Disney in 1941 during an animation strike. He would briefly reunite with Screen Gems before moving to the Metro-Goldwyn-Mayer cartoon studio in 1943, with his first short for them being War Dogs, followed by Baby Puss, his debut on the Tom and Jerry series.  While he mostly worked in the studio's Hanna-Barbera unit, he occasionally provided animation for  Tex Avery's unit in the 1950s (as well as Avery's substitute director Dick Lundy). He worked on several Academy Award-winning animation shorts: Mouse Trouble (1944), Quiet Please! (1945), The Little Orphan (1948), and Johann Mouse (1952). Patterson (along with his colleague Irven Spence) would briefly leave MGM in the mid 40's. During this period, he would help organize and educate animators from David Hand's Gaumount British Animation Studio. He and Spence would later move back to MGM in the late 40's.

Patterson left MGM permanently in 1953 and was briefly hired by Walter Lantz. He (alongside former Tex Avery animator Grant Simmons) would direct two shorts, Broadways Bow Wows and Dig that Dog. Months afterwards, Patterson and Simmons left Walter Lantz Productions and co-founded their own studio, Grantray-Lawrence Animation, which he operated until 1967. GrantRay-Lawrence's early work was providing animation for television commercials, including the original "Winston Tastes Good" campaign. The company later moved on to producing such animated television series as Spider-Man and The Marvel Superheroes.

After GrantRay-Lawrence folded in 1967, Patterson joined his former bosses at Hanna-Barbera, where he worked as a supervising director on several animated television series. Patterson was eventually promoted to vice president in charge of animation direction, a position he held until his retirement in 1993.

Patterson was awarded the 1999 Winsor McCay Award by the International Animated Film Society, ASIFA-Hollywood for his lifetime of contributions to the animation field.

Personal life and death 
Ray was married to June Walker Patterson. June worked at Disney as a cel painter. They had four daughters.

Patterson died of natural causes in Encino, California on December 30, 2001, a month after his 90th birthday.

References

External links 
 
 Death notice at the Animation Guild website

1911 births
2001 deaths
Animators from California
American directors
American animated film directors
American animated film producers
Walt Disney Animation Studios people
Hanna-Barbera people
People from Hollywood, Los Angeles
Metro-Goldwyn-Mayer cartoon studio people
Walter Lantz Productions people